Richard Lester Shimpfky (October 18, 1940 – February 28, 2011) was second bishop of the Episcopal Diocese of El Camino Real from 1990 to 2004. He was an alumnus of the University of Colorado and Virginia Theological Seminary.

Bishop Shimpfky graduated from the University of Colorado in 1963 where he was a member of the Sigma Phi Epsilon (SigEp) Fraternity.

In 1963 he joined the headquarters staff of the SigEp Fraternity, first as a traveling staff representative and then as the Director of Chapter Services, the number two professional management position. Staying in this job until 1967 when he was called to the religious life of the Episcopal Church.  He credited much of his outlook on helping and interacting with others on his college and professional experience with Sigma Phi Epsilon Fraternity whose motto is "Virtue, Diligence, and Brotherly Love."

Attending the Virginia Theological Seminary in Alexandria, Virginia, he became a deacon in 1970 and was ordained a priest in June 1971.
His first assignment was the Mt. Olivet parish in Alexandria, Virginia, which was followed by being rector of Christ Church in Ridgewood, New Jersey.

In 1990 He was elected Bishop of the El Camino Diocese which stretched from San Luis Obispo to Silicon Valley in California.
The Sigma Phi Epsilon Fraternity presented Bishop Shimpfky with the SigEp Citation in recognition for his life-long involvement and contributions.
He was nominated for the post of U.S. presiding bishop in 2002.
Resigning from his post in 2004, he moved back to New Jersey.
He served in the Diocese of Newark and the Diocese of Long Island, returning to Christ Church in Short Hills, New Jersey when terminally ill.

He died at the age of 70 in February 2011.

References 
Bishop Richard L. Shimpfky remembered for support of ethnic ministry

1940 births
2011 deaths
20th-century American Episcopalians
Episcopal bishops of El Camino Real
University of Colorado Boulder alumni
Virginia Theological Seminary alumni